Eugene Morse is an American internal auditor and whistleblower who uncovered massive accounting fraud at WorldCom in 2002.   Denise Cote, the United States District Judge who presided over the litigation related to the pre-petition Worldcom fraud officially found:

Morse earned his master's degree in business administration from Tulane University, and went on to become a chartered financial analyst, a certified internal auditor, and a certified public accountant.  Morse began his career at WorldCom in 1997 as part of the Financial Management Associate program and performed his duties in various WorldCom departments, including Internal Audit, International Settlements, Revenue Accounting, Budget, General Accounting, and Financial Planning. Cynthia Cooper, widely credited as the person who exposed the massive fraud, was the head of the Internal Audit department at Worldcom and  "encouraged Morse throughout his investigation" and reported the findings to the audit committee of WorldCom's board of directors on June 20, 2002.

References 

American accountants
Living people
Tulane University alumni
Year of birth missing (living people)
American whistleblowers
CFA charterholders